James Burrill Jr. (April 25, 1772 – December 25, 1820) was a Federalist-party United States senator representing the state of Rhode Island. He served in the senate from 1817 until 1820.  He graduated from the College of Rhode Island and Providence Plantations (the former name of Brown University) at Providence in 1788.

Burill was elected a member of the American Antiquarian Society in 1815.

The town of Burrillville, Rhode Island, is named for him.  His grandson is the American writer and public speaker, George William Curtis.

See also

List of United States Congress members who died in office (1790–1899)

References

Further reading

External links 

1772 births
1820 deaths
United States senators from Rhode Island
Brown University alumni
Rhode Island Federalists
Federalist Party United States senators
Members of the American Antiquarian Society
People from Providence, Rhode Island
People of colonial Rhode Island